Kevin Krawietz and Jürgen Melzer were the defending champions but chose not to defend their title.

Andrés Molteni and Hugo Nys won the title after defeating Ariel Behar and Gonzalo Escobar 6–4, 7–6(7–4) in the final.

Seeds

Draw

References

External links
 Main draw

Open du Pays d'Aix - Doubles
2020 Doubles